Valentina Nikolaevna Levko (13 August 1926 – 14 August 2018) was a Russian opera and chamber singer (contralto, mezzo-soprano), teacher, professor. She was a soloist of the Bolshoi Theater of USSR from 1960 to 1982. In 1969, she was awarded the People's Artist of the RSFSR.

In 2002, she was awarded the Order of Honour for many years of fruitful activity in the field of culture and art.

She died on 14 August 2018, the day after her 92nd birthday, after a long serious illness.

References

External links
   Секрет Валентины Левко. К юбилею выдающейся русской певицы
 Сюжет    о 90-летнем юбилее Валентины Левко
 Страница о Валентине Левко на сайте ГАБТ

1926 births
2018 deaths
Academic staff of Gnessin State Musical College
Operatic contraltos
Operatic mezzo-sopranos
Singers from Moscow
People's Artists of the USSR
Recipients of the Order of Honour (Russia)
Russian contraltos
Russian mezzo-sopranos
Russian music educators
20th-century Russian women opera singers
Soviet music educators
Soviet women singers
Women music educators
20th-century women educators